Gu Bin (Chinese: 顾斌; born 10 November 1991 in Shanghai) is a Chinese professional footballer who currently plays for Chinese Super League club Zhejiang Pro as a left winger.

Early life 
Gu Bin was born on November 10, 1991 into a poor family in Shanghai. When he was 2 years old, his parents divorced and his mother left the family. His father would die of lung cancer when he was 14, and he would be subsequently taken care of by his uncle and aunt. He received his preliminary education in the Fourth Preliminary School of Pingliang Road, a school famous for national footballers, but his family was too poor to afford a pair of football boots, let alone the costs of professional training after the preliminary school. His uncle tried to seek help from the Genbao Football Base, but before he could introduce Gu Bin, the academy refused him by claiming that all the youths in his age group in Shanghai had already been selected. Fortunately for Gu in 2008, Shanghai Shenhua took exception to him and offered him a professional contract.

Club career
At Shanghai Shenhua, Gu's skills and hard-work would impress the coaching staff, while his teammates nicknamed him as "Junior Hidetoshi Nakata". Su Maozhen, the coach and former Chinese international footballer would view Gu Bin as a talented and promising young player who is fast, agile in dribbling and gifted with a left foot that can always break through opponent's defences. With these praises from the coaching staff it would see Gu Bin promoted to the senior team in the 2009 league season. This was followed by selection to the Chinese U19 national team before being sent to Atletico de Madrid to train with the reserve team and study Spanish football in 2010.

In July 2011, Gu was loaned to A Lyga side FK Sūduva until 31 December. On 14 July 2011, Gu made his debut for FK Sūduva in the last group match of the 2011–12 UEFA Europa League against IF Elfsborg. This would be followed by his league debut on 24 July 2011 against FK Šiauliai in a 1-0 defeat. After his loan move Gu would return to Shenhua and the interim Head coach Florent Ibengé would hand him his debut on 28 April 2012 in a league game against Shandong Luneng, which ended in a 0-0 draw. In 2013, Gu would move to China League One side Chongqing F.C. on a one-year loan deal to gain more playing time. When he returned to Shenhua he was unused throughout the whole of the 2014 Chinese Super League campaign and was subsequently released at the end of the season.

Gu would join second tier club Shanghai Shenxin at the beginning of the 2016 league season on a free transfer and would go on to make his debut in a league game on 13 March 2016 against Dalian Transcendence F.C. that ended in a 3-1 defeat.
On 2 February 2019, Gu transferred to fellow League One side Zhejiang Greentown. He would make his debut in a league game on 10 March 2019 against Qingdao Huanghai in a 2-1 defeat. He would then play a vital part as the club gained promotion to the top tier at the end of the 2021 campaign. On 15 January 2023, Gu opened the scoring against Shandong Taishan in the 2022 Chinese FA Cup final, however Shandong came from behind to win the game 2-1.

Career statistics 
Statistics accurate as of match played 31 January 2023.

References

External links
 

1991 births
Living people
Chinese footballers
Footballers from Shanghai
Shanghai Shenhua F.C. players
FK Sūduva Marijampolė players
Shanghai Shenxin F.C. players
Zhejiang Professional F.C. players
Expatriate footballers in Lithuania
Chinese expatriate sportspeople in Lithuania
Chinese expatriate footballers
Chinese Super League players
China League One players
A Lyga players
Association football midfielders